Saniki  is a village in the administrative district of Gmina Tykocin, within Białystok County, Podlaskie Voivodeship, in north-eastern Poland.
On January 1, 2004, the traditional name of the village was restored to Saniki, as the incorrect name Sanniki was a clerical error.

References

Villages in Białystok County